The 2009 HP Open (also known as the 2009 HP Japan Women's Open Tennis) was a women's tennis tournament played on outdoor hard courts. It was the 1st edition of the HP Open, and was classified as an WTA International tournaments of the 2009 WTA Tour. It was played in Osaka, Japan.

Finals

Singles

 Samantha Stosur defeated  Francesca Schiavone 7–5, 6–1
 It was Stosur's 1st title of the year and the 1st of her career.

Doubles

 Chuang Chia-jung /  Lisa Raymond  defeated  Chanelle Scheepers /  Abigail Spears 6–2, 6–4

Players

Seeds

seeds are based on the rankings of October 5, 2009

Other entrants
The following players received wildcards into the singles main draw:
  Kimiko Date-Krumm
  Ryōko Fuda
  Kurumi Nara

The following players received entry from the qualifying draw:
  Anastasia Rodionova
  Chang Kai-Chen
  Sophie Ferguson
  Chanelle Scheepers

The following player received a lucky loser spot:
  Alexandra Panova

External links

 
Tennis tournaments in Japan
HP Open
HP Open
2009 in Japanese tennis